Stephen E Diggle (born 7 May 1955) is an English guitarist and vocalist in the punk band Buzzcocks.

Biography

Early years
Diggle was born on 7 May 1955 at Saint Mary's Hospital in Manchester, and grew up in the Bradford and Rusholme areas of the city, where he was a mod. After attending Oldham College, he got a job, but was dismissed for organising a strike.

Buzzcocks
He attended the Sex Pistols gig at Manchester's Lesser Free Trade Hall, in June 1976. Their manager Malcolm McLaren introduced him to guitarist Pete Shelley and vocalist Howard Devoto, who were looking for a bassist for their band, Buzzcocks. John Maher joined as drummer and six weeks later, Buzzcocks played their first concert. Steve played bass at several concerts and on the Spiral Scratch EP. Howard Devoto left Buzzcocks shortly after the EP was released, which prompted the band to reshuffle – Pete Shelley becoming lead vocalist as well as guitarist and Diggle switching from bass to guitar.

Steve Diggle wrote several songs for Buzzcocks, including "Autonomy", "Fast Cars" (co-written with Howard Devoto and Pete Shelley), "Love Is Lies" (perhaps the first Buzzcocks song featuring an acoustic guitar), "Sitting Round At Home", "You Know You Can't Help It", "Mad Mad Judy", "Airwaves Dream", and, perhaps his most famous song, "Harmony in My Head", a Top 40 hit in 1979.

Early solo career and Flag of Convenience
After Buzzcocks split in 1981, Diggle was briefly a solo artist, releasing the 50 Years of Comparative Wealth EP (with the guest participations of fellow-Buzzcocks Steve Garvey and John Maher) the same year. In 1982, he formed a new band, Flag of Convenience with ex-Buzzcock John Maher. Ex-Easterhouse drummer Gary Rostock played on Diggle's 2000 album Some Reality, released on Diggle's own label, 3:30 Records. In 2013, Diggle also appeared in the British punk-pop comedy Vinyl, playing himself.

Discography

Solo albums
 Some Reality (2000)
 Serious Contender (2005)
 Air Conditioning (2010)
 Inner Space Times (2016)

Compilations
The Best of Steve Diggle and Flag of Convenience – The Secret Public Years 1981–1989 (2000, Anagram)

Singles and EPs
 50 Years of Comparative Wealth E.P. (7" EP) (1981, Liberty)
 Heated and Rising EP (1991, 3:30 Records)

References

External links
 
 Steve Diggle's "Harmony In My Head"
 An Interview with Steve Diggle (UK)

1956 births
Living people
Buzzcocks members
English rock bass guitarists
Male bass guitarists
English rock guitarists
English punk rock guitarists
English male guitarists
English male singers
Musicians from Manchester
People from Rusholme